Keezhmad is a village in  Aluva. It is located 3 km from Aluva town, between the parallel Aluva - Perumbavoor roads, the KSRTC route along the Periyar river and "private" route that passes through Choondy and Chunangamveli. It is also the headquarter of the namesake Gramapanchayath in Ernakulam district in the state of Kerala, India. Keezhmad is known for educational institutions like Christava Mahilalayam Girls High School, Crescent Public School, Shivagiri Public school, Blind school etc. Keezhmad is well connected with adjacent places like Aluva Town and Perumbavoor by major roads. Proposed Sea port air port high way is passed through the heart of keezhmad. Kerala State Road Transport Corporation (KSRTC) operates regular services through this area in the circular form. The Indian navy commander, cdr Sreejesh Sivan , who was the war shipbuilding overseeing team leader for the recently built INS Vikrant came from Keezhmad. 

Keezhmad is blessed with scenic beauty.  The abundance of green foliage and paddy fields create an aura of beauty. Fertile land of Keezhmad is suitable for all crops include rice, rubber, coconut etc. The proximity of Periyar River, the lifeline of Kerala makes this land fertile.

Cities and towns in Ernakulam district